was a Japanese virologist. He shared the 1982 Albert Lasker Award for Basic Medical Research with Harold E. Varmus and J. Michael Bishop for demonstrating how RNA tumor viruses cause cancer, and elucidating their role in combining, rescuing and maintaining oncogenes in the viral genome.

Life
Hidesaburo Hanafusa was born on December 1, 1929, in Hyogo Prefecture. He received his PhD in Biochemistry in 1960 from Osaka University, where he also met his future wife, Teruko. After his research in the US and France, he was appointed as professor of molecular oncology at the Rockefeller University in 1973, and returned to Japan in 1998, becoming director at the Osaka Bioscience Institute.
He was a foreign associate of the US National Academy of Sciences and a member of the Japan Academy.

He died on March 15, 2009, of liver cancer, at the age of 79.

Awards
1982: Albert Lasker Award for Basic Medical Research
1983: Asahi Prize
1986: G.H. Clowes Memorial award, American Association for Cancer Research
1993: Alfred P. Sloan, Jr. Prize
1995: Order of Culture
2000: Doctorate of Science, honoris causa, Rockefeller University

See also
List of members of the National Academy of Sciences (Medical genetics, hematology, and oncology)

References

External links

1929 births
2009 deaths
Cancer researchers
Japanese virologists
Japanese molecular biologists
Recipients of the Order of Culture
Recipients of the Albert Lasker Award for Basic Medical Research
Foreign associates of the National Academy of Sciences
Rockefeller University faculty
Osaka University alumni
People from Hyōgo Prefecture
Deaths from cancer in Japan
Deaths from liver cancer